Shurabeh-ye Sofla may refer to:

Shurabeh-ye Sofla 1
Shurabeh-ye Sofla 2